Scopula scalercii is a moth of the family Geometridae that can be found in central and southern Italy.

References

Further reading
 2003: New Sterrhinae from Europe, North Africa, and the Caucasus (Lepidoptera: Geometridae). Entomologische Zeitschrift 113 (11): 319-328.

Moths described in 2003
Endemic fauna of Italy
scalercii
Moths of Europe